101 Philosophy Problems (1999) is a philosophy book for a general audiences by Martin Cohen published by Routledge.

Format and summary
The format of the book was unique and later copied by other authors. For example, in Julian Baggini's The Pig That Wants to Be Eaten it was observed that the books "format is essentially the same as that first successfully introduced by Martin Cohen's 101 Philosophy Problems."

In a review for the Times Higher Education Supplement (London), Harry Gensler, Professor of philosophy, at John Carroll University, Cleveland, describes the book:

"The book has 101 humorous little stories, each with a philosophical  problem (not however, necessarily, the usual Unsolved problems in philosophy). For example, problem 54 is about Mr Megasoft, who dies leaving  his fortune to his favourite computer. Megasoft's children take the matter to court, contending that the computer cannot think and so cannot inherit money. Mr Megasoft's lawyers claim that the computer can think. But on what grounds can we say that computers can or cannot think?"

Other stories deal with paradoxes, ethics, aesthetics, perception, time, God, physics, and knowledge and include  problems from Zeno, Descartes, Russell, Nelson Goodman, Edmund Gettier and others. The  problems are  followed by a discussion section  and a glossary.

Reception
In a review for The Philosopher, Dr. Zenon Stavrinides says that:

"Both in regard to its structure and the style in which it is written, it is very unconventional. The first part of the book consists of a series of very short stories or narrative texts, grouped by subject-matter, setting out problems or puzzles of philosophical interest. Some of these problems are well-known in philosophical literature, e.g. the paradox of Epimenides the Cretan, who said: 'All Cretans are liars'. In the second part of the book, entitled 'Discussions', Cohen provides explanations and analyses of the issues raised by each of the problems, with some references to the treatment offered by particular historical philosophers. These discussions are intelligent and balanced, if (in most cases at least) inevitably inconclusive."
 
101 Philosophy Problems has been reviewed in The Philosophers Magazine by Julian Baggini (Summer 1999); the Ilkley Gazette (May 29, 1999 ); The Guardian  (5.11.1999); and Der Spiegel (2001).

Editions
It has had three English editions and been translated into German, Dutch, Greek, Estonian, Korean, Chinese, Spanish, Portuguese, Japanese and other languages. The German translation has alone run to three editions, one by Campus and two by Piper, including a massmarket hardback edition. There also an edition in Persian.

References

Additional reviews
"101 Philosophy Problems, 2nd Ed." Choice: Current Reviews for Academic Libraries Sept. 2002: 114. Academic OneFile.
"101 Philosophy Problems." Philosophy in Review 20 (2000): 244. Academic OneFile.
"101 Philosophy Problems." Publishers Weekly 19 July 1999: 178. Academic OneFile.

External links

1999 books
Philosophy books
Routledge books
Public philosophy
Philosophy education